The Riet River is a westward-flowing tributary of the Vaal River in central South Africa. In precolonial times the Riet was known as the Gama-!ab (or Gmaap), a  name meaning 'muddy'. Its main tributary is the Modder River and after the confluence the Riet River flows westwards to meet the Vaal.

The Riet flows about 300 km from the vicinity of the eastern Free State town of Smithfield and has a confluence with the Vaal River upstream from the Northern Cape town of Douglas. It flows through the Kalkfontein Dam.
Water from the Orange River at Vanderkloof Dam is fed into the Riet River at Jacobsdal to provide water for irrigation. This has the combined effect of adding water to the river and lowering the salinity. When Vanderkloof Dam is spilling excess water from Vanderkloof Dam is transferred to the Kalkfontein Dam.

See also 
 List of rivers in South Africa
 Siege of Kimberley
 Battle of Paardeberg

References

External links
A Riet River Retrospective

Tributaries of the Orange River
Karoo
Rivers of the Northern Cape
Rivers of the Free State (province)